Moses Fellows (November 7, 1803 – September 25, 1879) was an American politician who served as the fourth mayor of Manchester, New Hampshire.

Fellows was born to Simon and Dorthy (Bartlett) Fellows in Brentwood, New Hampshire on November 7, 1803.

While he lived in Brentwood, until he resigned in 1827, Fellows was a Sergeant in the New Hampshire Militia.

Fellows was Chairman of the Manchester Board of Selectmen  in 1842-1843 and 1846, also in 1846 a member of the Manchester board of Aldermen, and a member of the New Hampshire House of Representatives in 1847–1848.

In 1850-1851 Fellows was the mayor of Manchester, New Hampshire, having been elected in the city's 1850 and 1851 mayoral elections.

Death
Fellows died on September 25, 1879.

Notes

 

1803 births
1879 deaths
Mayors of Manchester, New Hampshire
Members of the New Hampshire House of Representatives
19th-century American politicians
People from Brentwood, New Hampshire